The Vintage Ultralight SR-1 Hornet is an American homebuilt aircraft produced by the Vintage Ultralight and Lightplane Association of Marietta, Georgia, introduced in the early 1980s. The aircraft was supplied in the form of plans for amateur construction, although plans are no longer available.

Design and development

The SR-1 Hornet features a strut-braced and cable-braced biplane layout, a single-seat open cockpit, fixed conventional landing gear with a steerable tail wheel, and a single engine in pusher configuration.

The aircraft is made from bolted-together aluminum tubing, with its flying surfaces covered in doped aircraft fabric. The Hornet has the largest wing area and lightest wing loading of any ultralight of its period. The engine is mounted between four tubes that support the tail surfaces.

The designer estimated the construction time from the supplied plans as 250 hours.

Operational history
The Hornet was widely sold in the United States in the 1980s.

In the United States ultralights are not required to be registered, and in April 2014 no examples were in fact registered in the United States with the Federal Aviation Administration, although a total of two had been registered at one time.

Specifications (SR-1 Hornet)

References

External links
Official website archive on Archive.org
Hornet photo
Hornet photo

SR-1 Hornet
1980s United States sport aircraft
1980s United States ultralight aircraft
Single-engined pusher aircraft
Biplanes
Homebuilt aircraft